Vriesea mollis is a plant species in the genus Vriesea. This species is endemic to Brazil.

References

mollis
Flora of Brazil